Mohammad-Reza Hossein-Nejad(born 1965) is an Iranian conservative politician who currently serves as the governor of North Khorasan Province. Hossein-Nejad was a member of the Parliament of Iran from 2008 to 2012, representing Shirvan.

Education 
Mohammad-Reza Hossein-Nejad holds a bachelor's degree in civil engineering from Ferdowsi University of Mashhad.

References

Governors of North Khorasan Province
1965 births
Ferdowsi University of Mashad alumni
Members of the 8th Islamic Consultative Assembly
Living people